Karin Christiaan Ida Catharina Stevens (born 11 June 1989) and known since 2015 as Stevie Malagrida, is a Dutch football striker, who plays for DVC Eva's Tienen in the women's Belgian First Division (second tier). She has also played for the Dutch national team.

Club career
Her career started at amateur clubs Leonidas Wolder and later SC Jekerdal where she played amongst the boys teams. She began as an offensive midfielder able to play in any position in the front. When the Dutch women's professional league (Eredivisie Vrouwen) was established in 2007, she signed to play for FC Twente, however she was prevented from playing for the club due to regulations restricting the number of national team players per club, in order to play she moved to Willem II.

In her first season (2007–08) at Willem II, she scored 20 goals in 22 matches and was the club and league top scorer. In her second season (2008–09) she managed 10 goals in 12 matches as a shoulder injury sidelined her for five months of the season. She received offers to play for clubs abroad, Brøndby IF (Denmark) and LdB FC Malmö (Sweden) showed interest, but planning for a career after football she decided to decline the offers from abroad. The shoulder injury required a second operation and she missed almost the entire 2009–10, playing just 2 matches and scoring 1 goal.

She was making her comeback during the 2010–11 season and played 4 matches scoring 1 goal, when on 4 January 2011, she joined Lierse in the Belgian First Division. At the end of the season, on 4 August 2011, she decided to retire from football.

In May 2015, she agreed a contract with Ladies Genk and in August 2015 she made a comeback under a new name . She played 9 matches of the 2015–16 Belgian Super League season for Ladies Genk.

She moved from Genk to DVC Eva's Tienen ahead of the 2016–17 Super League season. She played 3 matches for Tienen that season.

International career
She made her debut for the Netherlands women's national football team under coach Vera Pauw on 31 August 2006, in a 4–0 World Cup qualifying defeat to England.

She played an important part in qualifying the Netherlands to the UEFA Women's Euro 2009 for the first time by scoring three of the Dutch four goals in the two legs 2009 Euro qualifying play-offs against Spain. She was selected for the Dutch team which reached the semifinals of the UEFA Women's Euro 2009, playing all of the Netherlands five matches in the tournament and scoring the second goal of the country debut match in major tournaments, against Ukraine. The semifinal match England was her 35th and last match for the national team, she scored 16 goals.

International goals
Scores and results list the Netherlands goal tally first.

References

21. twitter page : https://twitter.com/karinstevens111?s=21

1989 births
Living people
Footballers from Maastricht
Dutch women's footballers
Netherlands women's international footballers
Expatriate women's footballers in Belgium
Eredivisie (women) players
Willem II (women) players
Women's association football midfielders
Super League Vrouwenvoetbal players
Lierse SK (women) players
KRC Genk Ladies players
Dutch expatriate women's footballers
Dutch expatriate sportspeople in Belgium